Drowning Pool is the fourth studio album by American rock band Drowning Pool. It was released on April 27, 2010. It is the band's first album not to feature a different singer, as Ryan McCombs remained with Drowning Pool after their 2007 album Full Circle, although this album ended up being the last album to feature him, as he left the band in 2011 to rejoin his previous band SOiL. McCombs eventually rejoined Drowning Pool in 2023.

The song "Feel Like I Do" was released as a digital single. It reflects a tough period in McCombs' life during which he went through a divorce, moved out of his home and lost his father.  Fans who preordered the album received a download of the single as well as the second single "Turn So Cold" starting April 13, 2010.
According to Blabbermouth.net, Drowning Pool's self-titled album sold 12,000 copies in its first week, earning it the number 35 spot on the Billboard 200, up from the number 64 reached by Full Circle in 2007.

Three singles, "Feel Like I Do", "Turn So Cold" and "Let the Sin Begin" were released to promote the album. The first two singles reached top 10 in the Hot Mainstream Rock Tracks charts. It was thought that "Regret" would have been released as the third single. However, this never happened for unknown reasons.

In late 2010, the band announced their intentions to record a music video for each of the album's songs.

The band ceased promotion of the album in 2011 due to Ryan McCombs' departure. The band began writing new material and have recorded and performed with Jasen Moreno from 2012 to 2023, before McCombs returned.

Track listing

Personnel
 Ryan McCombs – vocals
 C.J. Pierce – guitar
 Mike Luce – drums
 Stevie Benton – bass

Additional musicians 
John Bender – additional backing vocals/additional vocal production

Charts

References

2010 albums
Drowning Pool albums
Eleven Seven Label Group albums